Charles Méré (29 January 1883 – 2 October 1970) was a French film director, screenwriter, and playwright.

Biography
Méré was born in Marseille, France, and was president of the Société des Auteurs et Compositeurs Dramatiques (Society of Dramatic Authors and Composers, or SACD) from 1929 to 1944.

Méré was the author of 41 plays, including six for the Grand Guignol, and librettist of three lyrical dramas.

He co-produced two films and a couple of movies were made from his works.

Selected filmography
Les Trois Masques, directed by Henry Krauss (1921, based on the play Les Trois Masques)
The Flame, directed by René Hervil (1926, based on the play La Flamme)
Le Vertige, directed by Marcel L'Herbier (1926, based on the play Le Vertige)
The Masked Woman, directed by Silvano Balboni (1927, based on the play La Femme masquée)
Prince Jean, directed by René Hervil (1928, based on the play Le Prince Jean)
Temptation, directed by René Barberis and René Leprince (1929, based on the play La Tentation)
The Three Masks, directed by André Hugon (1929, based on the play Les Trois Masques)
Prince Jean, directed by Jean de Marguenat (1934, based on the play Le Prince Jean)
The Flame, directed by André Berthomieu (1936, based on the play La Flamme)
, directed by Pierre Caron (1936, based on the play La Tentation)
, directed by Maurice Cloche (1958, based on the play Prisons de femmes)

Screenwriter
  (dir. Henri Desfontaines, 1921)
Serge Panine (dir.
 (dir. Jean Delannoy, 1942)
 (dir. Jean de Limur, 1942)
 (dir. Jean-Paul Paulin, 1943)

Director
Golden Venus (1938, co-director Jean Delannoy)
Serge Panine (1939, co-director  )

Producer
 (dir. Jean Delannoy, 1942)
 (dir. Jean de Limur, 1942)
It Happened at the Inn (dir. Jacques Becker, 1943)
The Last Judgment (dir. René Chanas, 1945)

References

External links

1883 births
1970 deaths
French film directors
French male screenwriters
20th-century French screenwriters
Mass media people from Marseille
20th-century French dramatists and playwrights
20th-century French male writers